A Real Live One is a live album by English heavy metal band Iron Maiden, released on 22 March 1993. The album tracks were recorded at 9 different venues in Europe during the Fear of the Dark Tour in 1992. This album features songs from the Somewhere in Time (1986) through Fear of the Dark (1992) eras, while counterpart A Real Dead One only contains songs from the pre-Somewhere in Time albums.

When Iron Maiden re-released all of their pre-The X Factor albums in 1998, this album was combined with A Real Dead One to form the 2-disc A Real Live Dead One. The album cover was made by longtime Iron Maiden cover artist Derek Riggs, whose work for the Fear of the Dark album was rejected. "Fear of the Dark" was released as a single.

Track listing

Personnel
Production and performance credits are adapted from the album liner notes.
Iron Maiden
 Bruce Dickinson – vocals
 Dave Murray – guitar
 Janick Gers – guitar, backing vocals
 Steve Harris – bass, backing vocals, producer, mixing
 Nicko McBrain – drums
Additional musicians
 Michael Kenney – keyboards
Production
 Mick McKenna – engineer
 Tim Young – mastering
Derek Riggs – cover illustration
Tony Mottram – photography
George Chin – photography
Rod Smallwood – management
Andy Taylor – management

Charts

Certifications

References

Iron Maiden live albums
1993 live albums
Live heavy metal albums